"Be on You" is the fifth official single from Flo Rida's second album, R.O.O.T.S.. It features Ne-Yo and is produced by Stargate. Despite gaining much airplay in July 2009, the single wasn't officially released until October 2009, due to Flo Rida focusing on promoting his other single "Jump". It takes a famous line from the  movie Anchorman: The Legend of Ron Burgundy and uses it as its chorus.

Chart performance
"Be on You" entered the US Billboard Hot 100 at number 75 in April 2009, even though it was not released as a single. On July 30, 2009, "Be on You" along with "Jump", re-entered the Billboard 100 at numbers 90 and 76, respectively. It peaked at 19 in the United States, making it Flo Rida's sixth top 20 hit on the Hot 100.

Charts

Weekly charts

Monthly charts

Year-end charts

References

2009 singles
Flo Rida songs
Ne-Yo songs
Song recordings produced by Stargate (record producers)
Songs written by Ne-Yo
Songs written by Tor Erik Hermansen
Songs written by Mikkel Storleer Eriksen
2009 songs
Songs written by Flo Rida